Local elections were held in the United Kingdom in 1977. The results were a major mid-term setback for the Labour government, and the Conservatives, the main opposition, comprehensively regained control of the Greater London Council with 64 seats against Labour's 28. Elections were also held in the county councils and in Northern Ireland.

The Conservative Party gained 1,293 seats, bringing their number of councillors to 12,370. The Labour Party lost 1,098 seats, leaving them with 7,115 councillors. The Liberal Party lost 163 seats, leaving them with 950 councillors.

Changes were as follows:
Conservative gain from no overall control - Bedfordshire, Cambridgeshire, Cumbria, Gloucestershire, Hampshire, Hertfordshire, Leicestershire, Lincolnshire, Norfolk, Warwickshire, Wiltshire, Worcestershire
Conservative gain from Labour - Derbyshire, Northamptonshire, Nottinghamshire, Staffordshire
Conservative gain from Independent - Isle of Wight

Summary of results

England

Unicameral area

Metropolitan county councils

Non-metropolitan county councils

Sui generis

Northern Ireland

Scotland

District councils

Wales

County councils

References

Local elections 2006. House of Commons Library Research Paper 06/26.
Vote 2001 BBC News
Vote 2009 BBC News

 
Local elections